Antim Peak is the ice-covered peak rising to 2080 m in Imeon Range on Smith Island in the South Shetland Islands, Antarctica.  Situated  2.25 km and 1.3 km northeast of the summit Mount Foster and Evlogi Peak respectively, 5.4 km south-southwest of Mount Pisgah, 16 km southwest of Cape Smith, and 16 km northeast of Cape James.  The peak surmounts Chuprene Glacier to the west and northwest, Krivodol Glacier to the northeast and east, and Pashuk Glacier to the southeast.  Precipitous and partly ice-free southeast slopes.  Confirmed to be a separate peak rather than part of Mount Foster by the team of Greg Landreth that made the first ascent of the latter in 1996.

Antim Peak was first ascended by the French mountaineers Mathieu Cortial, Lionel Daudet and Patrick Wagnon on 12 January 2010.  Their route called Le vol du sérac (Flight of the Serac) followed the western spur of the peak.

The peak is named after Exarch Antim I (1816–1888), the first head of the Bulgarian Exarchate reestablishing the autocephaly of the Bulgarian Church in 1870.

See also
 Imeon Range
 List of Bulgarian toponyms in Antarctica

Maps

Chart of South Shetland including Coronation Island, &c. from the exploration of the sloop Dove in the years 1821 and 1822 by George Powell Commander of the same. Scale ca. 1:200000. London: Laurie, 1822.
  L.L. Ivanov. Antarctica: Livingston Island and Greenwich, Robert, Snow and Smith Islands. Scale 1:120000 topographic map. Troyan: Manfred Wörner Foundation, 2010.  (First edition 2009. )
 South Shetland Islands: Smith and Low Islands. Scale 1:150000 topographic map No. 13677. British Antarctic Survey, 2009.
 Antarctic Digital Database (ADD). Scale 1:250000 topographic map of Antarctica. Scientific Committee on Antarctic Research (SCAR). Since 1993, regularly upgraded and updated.
 L.L. Ivanov. Antarctica: Livingston Island and Smith Island. Scale 1:100000 topographic map. Manfred Wörner Foundation, 2017.

Notes

References
 Antim Peak. SCAR Composite Antarctic Gazetteer.
 Bulgarian Antarctic Gazetteer. Antarctic Place-names Commission. (details in Bulgarian, basic data in English)

External links
 Antim Peak. Copernix satellite image

Bulgaria and the Antarctic
Mountains of Smith Island (South Shetland Islands)